Támara is a town and municipality in the Department of Casanare, Colombia. It borders in the north Sacama, in the east Pore and Paz de Ariporo, in the west Socotá of the department of Boyacá and in the south Nunchia and Paya, Boyacá.

History 
Támara before the Spanish conquest of the Muisca was an important cotton producing village.

Modern Támara was founded on August 6, 1628, by José Dadey Pey.

Economy 
Main economical activities in Támara are agriculture; coffee, yuca, maize, bananas and sugarcane and livestock farming.

References 

Municipalities of Casanare Department
Populated places established in 1628
1628 establishments in the Spanish Empire